The Polk Sisters' House is a historic house in Columbia, Tennessee, that was the home of two sisters of U.S. President James K. Polk.

History 
The Polk Sisters' House was built in 1818 by Samuel Polk for his oldest daughter Jane Maria Polk Walker, she lived in the home until her eleventh child. Rally Hill would then be constructed for her family. Ophelia Polk Hayes would move into the home after her older sister moved.

It is next door to the James K. Polk Home and houses its visitors' center, museum room, and gift shop.

References

Houses on the National Register of Historic Places in Tennessee
Houses in Columbia, Tennessee
Federal architecture in Tennessee
Houses completed in 1818
National Register of Historic Places in Maury County, Tennessee